The Clemson Tigers men's basketball teams of 1970–1979 represented Clemson University in NCAA college basketball competition.

1969–70

1970–71

1971–72

1972–73

1973–74

1974–75

1975–76

Roster

Schedule

1976–77

Roster

Schedule

1977–78

1978–79

References

Games: 
Coaches: 

1970